Since 2004, the International Folk Art Market has hosted more than 1000 master folk artists from 100 countries in the world's largest exhibition and sale of works by master folk artists. Artist earnings have exceeded $34 million and impacted more than one million lives in the communities they represent. The Market offers folk artists a respected spot in the global marketplace to gather together and share their handmade traditions and to create economic, social, and individual empowerment.

The International Folk Art Market is held during one weekend of July on Museum Hill in Santa Fe, New Mexico. Its mission is to create economic opportunities for and with folk artists worldwide who celebrate and preserve folk art traditions. The International Folk Art Market envisions a world that values the dignity and humanity of the handmade, honors timeless cultural traditions, and supports the work of folk artists serving as entrepreneurs and catalysts for positive social change.

History
The Market was founded by businesswoman Judith Espinar, together with Thomas Aageson, executive director of the Museum of New Mexico Foundation and former executive director of Aid to Artisans; the former Market executive director, Charlene Cerny, formerly director of the Museum of International Folk Art in Santa Fe, and Charmay Allred, a community philanthropist. The State of New Mexico Department of Cultural Affairs, the Museum of International Folk Art, and the Museum of New Mexico Foundation are the primary strategic partners.  In its inaugural year, the market hosted sixty participating folk artists. By 2008, the number of artists grew to 125 artists from 41 different countries and in 2009, 126 artists from 46 nations.,

UNESCO (United Nations Educational, Scientific, and Cultural Organization) was an early sponsor, providing funding for ten artists, followed by an artist-training program in 22 countries. UNESCO has given its Award of Excellence to several products beginning in 2007.  In 2009, three booths featured UNESCO award-winning work.  In 2008, 97% of the market artists were from developing countries in Africa, Asia, Latin America, Central Asia, and the Middle East.

The Market supported an initiative to train cultural entrepreneurs in Africa through the W.K. Kellogg Intern Program. The program funded four arts professionals from Africa, to prepare the interns to develop folk art markets in their home countries. In 2008, the arts professionals in this program were: Mahaliah Kowa, former Project Coordinator of the Harambe Afrika! Festival in Johannesburg; Chila Smith Lino, marketing director of the non-profit Nacional de Artesanato in Mozambique; Nomvula Moshoai-Cook, chairperson for the Mpumulanga Traditional Arts Festival in South Africa; and Jane Parsons, Crafts Consultant for the Harare International Festival of the Arts in Zimbabwe.

Clinton Global Initiative
Former President Bill Clinton had commissioned three market artists to create prizes that were presented in September 2009 to the winners of the Clinton Global Citizen Awards—which honored individuals and organizations for their philanthropic contributions to global welfare. The work of the three artists, Serge Jolimeau and Michee Remy of Haiti and Toyin Folorunso of Nigeria, represented recycled metals.

References

External links
Market web site

Culture of Santa Fe, New Mexico
Tourist attractions in Santa Fe, New Mexico
American folk art
Arts festivals in the United States